Éric Delaunay (born 4 December 1987) is a French sports shooter. He competed in the men's skeet event at the 2016 Summer Olympics. He qualified to represent France at the 2020 Summer Olympics.

References

External links
 

1987 births
Living people
French male sport shooters
Olympic shooters of France
Shooters at the 2016 Summer Olympics
People from Saint-Lô
Skeet shooters
Sportspeople from Manche
European Games competitors for France
Shooters at the 2015 European Games
Shooters at the 2019 European Games
Shooters at the 2020 Summer Olympics